The Prior General of the Order of Carmelites is the Superior General of the Order of the Brothers of the Blessed Virgin Mary of Mount Carmel, commonly known as the Carmelites.

Prior General of the Order

Notes

References 

Carmelites
Carmelites